Eduardo Rodríguez Reyes [Volanta] (March 6, 1952 – March 6, 2009) was a Puerto Rican professional baseball pitcher. He played in Major League Baseball from  through  for the Milwaukee Brewers (1973–78) and Kansas City Royals (1979), mostly as a relief pitcher. He also pitched in the Puerto Rico Baseball League for the Criollos de Caguas and Indios de Mayagüez. He was born in Barceloneta, Puerto Rico.

In a seven-season career, Rodríguez posted a 42–36 record with a 3.89 ERA and 32 saves in 264 appearances, including 39 starts, one shutout and seven complete games, giving up 317 earned runs on 681 hits and 323 walks while striking out 430 in 734 innings of work. As a hitter, Rodríguez belted a triple (and scored on an error) in his first and only at bat, joining Chuck Lindstrom (1958), Scott Munninghoff (1980), and Eric Cammack (2000) as the only players to accomplish this feat in major league history.

Rodríguez died at his Barceloneta home of a heart attack on his 57th birthday.

See also
 List of Major League Baseball players from Puerto Rico

References

External links

1952 births
2009 deaths
People from Barceloneta, Puerto Rico
Major League Baseball pitchers
Milwaukee Brewers players
Kansas City Royals players
Danville Warriors players
Evansville Triplets players
Shreveport Captains players
Major League Baseball players from Puerto Rico